Richard Grobschmidt (May 3, 1948July 23, 2016) was an American educator and former Democratic politician from South Milwaukee, Wisconsin. He served five terms in the Wisconsin State Assembly (1985–1995) and parts of three terms in the Wisconsin State Senate (1995–2003), before resigning to take a position with the Wisconsin Department of Public Instruction.

Background 
Grobschmidt was born in Milwaukee on May 3, 1948 to Chester W. Grobschmidt and Leone Grobschmidt. His father was mayor of South Milwaukee from 1966 to 1994. Grobschmidt graduated from South Milwaukee High School in 1966; earned a B.S. from University of Wisconsin–Oshkosh in 1972, and a M.S. from University of Wisconsin–Milwaukee in 1979. He taught political science at South Milwaukee High before being elected to the Wisconsin Legislature.

Legislative service 
Grobschmidt was elected to the state Assembly in 1984, and re-elected for the next five terms for the 21st district, representing South Milwaukee and portions of Oak Creek. He was elected for the 7th district State Senate seat (representing several southeastern Milwaukee County suburbs, plus a fraction of eastern Milwaukee) in a November 1995 special election; and reelected in 1998 and 2002.

Department of Public Instruction 
In December 2002, he announced that he would resign his seat in January 2003 to take a position as Assistant Superintendent of Public Instruction under State Superintendent Elizabeth Burmaster. He retired from that position on September 10, 2010.

Death and legacy
Grobschmidt died on July 23, 2016 in Wauwatosa, Wisconsin. A bridge on the Hank Aaron State Trail in Lakeshore State Park was named after Grobschmidt in 2017.

References 

1948 births
2016 deaths
Schoolteachers from Wisconsin
Democratic Party members of the Wisconsin State Assembly
Politicians from Milwaukee
Educators from Wisconsin
University of Wisconsin–Milwaukee alumni
University of Wisconsin–Oshkosh alumni
Democratic Party Wisconsin state senators
People from South Milwaukee, Wisconsin